Heads and Hearts is the fourth studio album by English post-punk band the Sound, recorded in late 1984 and released in February 1985 by record label Statik.

Three singles were released from the album: "One Thousand Reasons", "Temperature Drop" and "Under You".

Background 
Heads and Hearts was recorded in November 1984 at Townhouse Studios in London.

Andy Kellman of AllMusic opined that the album saw the group "riding the wave of optimism—or maybe it would be better to say enthusiasm or vigor—that shot through them as they found themselves revitalized after parting ways with a major label", citing the album's "sweepingly hopeful sensibility", despite calling the album's first track "one of the Sound's weariest, most exasperated-with-the-rigors-of-existence songs in their quiver".

Release 
The first single from the album was "One Thousand Reasons", released in 1984.

Heads and Hearts was released in 1985 by Statik Records. Two more singles followed, "Temperature Drop" and "Under You".

The album was remastered and reissued in 1996 by Renascent along with the preceding Shock of Daylight EP.

Reception 

Heads and Hearts was modestly received by critics. Trouser Press called the album "even better" than the Shock of Daylight EP, writing that "the record's modesty and continuous flow make it a thoroughly engaging listen".

The Sound drummer Michael Dudley, on the other hand, later qualified the album as "a real low point – drab, lifeless and miserable".

Track listing

Personnel 
 The Sound

 Adrian Borland – vocals, guitar
 Michael Dudley – drums
 Graham Bailey – bass
 Colvin Mayers – keyboards, guitar

 Additional personnel

 Ian Nelson – saxophone on "Whirlpool", "Under You" and "Love is Not a Ghost"
 Gavin MacKillop – engineering
 Richard Manwaring – engineering
 Simon Smart – engineering
 Ben Kape – engineering assistance
 Nick Collins – engineering assistance
 Steven Chase – engineering assistance
 Wally Brill – production
 23 Envelope – sleeve design

References

External links 

 

1985 albums
The Sound (band) albums